Robert Abirached (25 August 1930 – 15 July 2021) was a French writer and theatrologist. He moved to Paris in 1948 and was admitted to the École normale supérieure in 1952. He earned a doctoral degree from the Sorbonne in 1974.

Principal works
Écrivains d’aujourd’hui (1940-1960) (1960)
Casanova ou la dissipation (1961)
L’Emerveillée (1963)
Tu connais la musique? (1971)
Jean Vauthier (1973)
La Crise du personnage dans le théâtre moderne (1978)
La Décentralisation théâtrale
Le Premier Âge, 1945-1958 (1992)
Les Années Malraux, 1959-1968 (1993)
1968, le tournant (1994)
Le Temps des incertitudes, 1969-1981 (1995)
Le Théâtre et le Prince (2005)
Le Théâtre en France au xxe siècle (2011)

Distinctions
Prix Sainte-Beuve (1961)
Commander of the Ordre des Arts et des Lettres (1981)
 (1984)
Officer of the Legion of Honour (1992)
Commander of the Ordre national du Mérite (1998)
Commander of the Ordre des Palmes académiques (2001)

References

1930 births
2021 deaths
Theatrologists
French writers
Lebanese emigrants to France
École Normale Supérieure alumni
Academic staff of Paris Nanterre University
People from Beirut
Commandeurs of the Ordre des Arts et des Lettres
Officiers of the Légion d'honneur
Commanders of the Ordre national du Mérite
Commandeurs of the Ordre des Palmes Académiques